Nine presidents of the United States have made presidential visits to North Africa. The first trips by a sitting president to countries in North Africa were those of Franklin D. Roosevelt, and were an offshoot of Allied diplomatic interactions during World War II.
Of the five countries in the region, only Libya has not yet been visited by an American president.

Table of visits

Visits by former presidents
Ulysses S. Grant visited Alexandria, Egypt, met with Khedive Isma'il Pasha, sailed up the Nile to tour the Valley of the Kings, and travelled by train down the length of the Suez Canal in 1878, during a post-presidency world tour.
Richard Nixon (without official State Department credentials) attended the funeral of Mohammad Reza Pahlavi, former Shah of Iran, in Cairo, July 29, 1980.
Richard Nixon, Gerald Ford and Jimmy Carter were among the dignitaries representing the United States at the funeral of Egyptian President Sadat in Cairo, October 10, 1981.

See also
 Algeria–United States relations
 Egypt–United States relations
 Libya–United States relations
 Morocco–United States relations
 Tunisia–United States relations
 Foreign policy of the United States
 Foreign relations of the United States

References

Algeria–United States relations
Egypt–United States relations
Libya–United States relations
Morocco–United States relations
Tunisia–United States relations
Lists of United States presidential visits
Politics of World War II